Ebube Nwagbo is a Nigerian actress and an entrepreneur

Personal life 
Nwagbo is from  Umuchu, a town in Aguata Local Government Area of Anambra State, Eastern Nigeria but grew up in Warri in Delta State. She is first of her parents six children. She studied Mass Communication at Nnamdi Azikiwe University.

Filmography 
She started acting in 2003 at the age of 20. 
Arrested by Love
Eyes of the Nun
Before My Eyes
Against My Blood
Royal Palace
Mama, I Will Die for You
Power of Trust
Not Yours!
Ojuju calabar
Me Without You (2019)

References

External links 

1983 births
Nnamdi Azikiwe University alumni
21st-century Nigerian actresses
Living people
Nigerian film actresses
Actresses from Anambra State
Igbo actresses